Ripyville is a ghost town in Anderson County, in the U.S. state of Kentucky.

A post office was established at Ripyville in 1867, and remained in operation until 1905. The community was named for John Ripy, an early merchant.

References

Geography of Anderson County, Kentucky
Ghost towns in Kentucky